Jean Marie Coulston (8 October 1934 – 30 January 2001) was a New Zealand cricketer who played primarily as a right-arm medium bowler. She appeared in five Test matches for New Zealand between 1954 and 1957. She played domestic cricket for Wellington.

References

External links
 
 

1934 births
2001 deaths
People from Petone
New Zealand women cricketers
New Zealand women Test cricketers
Wellington Blaze cricketers